Ian Gent is a British computer scientist working in the area of artificial intelligence and specialising in the area of constraint programming. He is a professor at the University of St Andrews. He (along with Toby Walsh) first wrote about the phase transition in many NP complete problems, in particular SAT. He was also one of the first researchers to investigate full generic methods to handle symmetry in constraint programming.

Gent founded recomputation.org, to promote reproducible experiments in computer science.

He was one of the founders of the csplib.org website, and popularised the Petrie Multiplier.

In January 2013 Gent founded the blog Depressed Academics with Mikael Vejdemo-Johansson.

References

External links
  
 

Living people
Academics of the University of St Andrews
British computer scientists
Year of birth missing (living people)